Pseudopallene is a genus of sea spider.

Species
 Pseudopallene circularis (Goodsir, 1842)
 Pseudopallene constricta Arango & Brenneis, 2013
 Pseudopallene flava Arango & Brenneis, 2013
 Pseudopallene gracilis Arango & Brenneis, 2013
 Pseudopallene harrisi Arango & Brenneis, 2013
 Pseudopallene tasmania Arango & Brenneis, 2013

References

Pycnogonids
Chelicerate genera